Nicholas Richard Trail Gubbins (born 31 December 1993) is an English first-class cricketer who plays for Hampshire. 

He is a left-handed batsman and right arm leg spin bowler. He made his first-class debut for Leeds/Bradford MCCU against Yorkshire, on 5 April 2013. He made his Middlesex debut in the summer of 2014 against Northamptonshire and immediately impressed in his first 2 matches, scoring three 50s which included a top score of 95.

He joined Hampshire, initially on loan, in July 2021. He officially left Middlesex at that time, intending to join Hampshire on a permanent basis at the end of the season-long loan period.

References

External links
 

1993 births
Living people
People from Richmond, London
English cricketers
Hampshire cricketers
Leeds/Bradford MCCU cricketers
Middlesex cricketers 
North v South cricketers
Alumni of the University of Leeds
Matabeleland Tuskers cricketers
Southern Rocks cricketers